Oslofjord Convention Center is a convention center in Stokke, Norway, as well as the company established to manage the facility.

Ownership and management
Oslofjord Convention Center is a commercial entity (joint-stock company) with Stiftelsen Brunstad Stevnested as its ultimate parent entity. Until 2000 the facility was only used by Brunstad Christian Church. Following a major upgrade in 2004, the center now operates as a commercial convention center hosting large-scale corporate exhibitions and conventions.

Oslofjord Convention Center

Brunstad Christian Church purchased the farm Nedre Brunstad Gård in 1956.

In 2004, a major upgrade costing more than 620 million Norwegian krone was completed.  The conference center can accommodate more than 8,000 people and its main hall seats 6,800. Previously called Brunstad Conference Center, it was renamed Oslofjord Convention Center in 2011 and operates on a commercial basis. Brunstad Christian Church remains Oslofjord's largest customer and holds annual conferences at the center bringing together over 8,000 people from around the world.

A further expansion budgeted at more than one billion Norwegian krone is planned, which will double the center's capacity and include the construction of exhibition buildings and sports, equestrian and swimming facilities. A number of architectural firms, including London-based Allford Hall Monaghan Morris, have been shortlisted to design the new facilities.

The center has several fast food restaurants, a cafeteria-style restaurant, coffee bar, and its own grocery store.  DKM Forum is also located at the facility.

Events 
The largest horse show in Norway, the Arctic Equestrian Games, is held at Oslofjord Convention Center. The first event was held in February 2006.

References

External links

 

Brunstad Christian Church
Hotels in Vestfold og Telemark
Stokke
1956 establishments in Norway
Event venues established in 1956
Convention centres in Norway